Christiane Sourvinou-Inwood (February 26, 1945 – May 19, 2007) was a scholar in the field of Ancient Greek religion and a highly influential Hellenist.

Biography
Sourvinou-Inwood was born in Volos, Greece, in 1945, but grew up in Corfu. Sourvinou-Inwood studied at the University of Athens from 1962–66, where she specialised in history and archaeology, and was a pupil of the Greek prehistoric archaeologist Spyridon Marinatos; after graduating with a starred first in Classics, she began research in the field of Mycenology in Rome, publishing her first article on the reading of a Linear B tablet from Knossos in 1968.

Sourvinou-Inwood moved to the UK in 1969, and graduated from Oxford in 1973 with a doctorate on Minoan civilization and Mycenaean beliefs in the afterlife. She subsequently worked as a lecturer in classical archaeology at Liverpool (1976–78), a senior research Fellow at University College, Oxford (1990–95), and Reader in Classical Literature at the University of Reading (1995–98).

Career and influence
After her initial research into Minoan and Mycenaean Greece, Sourvinou-Inwood moved to studying Archaic and Classical Greece, in particular Greek religion, employing evidence from a wide variety of sources including material culture and iconography as well as literary texts, mythology, and ritual practices. She has been praised for the clarity and directness of her approach. In the words of a colleague, "she wanted scholars to abandon fashionable assumptions" and "to read ancient texts through the eyes of their contemporary readers"; she insisted on the need to eliminate anachronistic modern assumptions from the study of the ancient world in order to reconstruct the perceptions, beliefs, and ideologies of people in the ancient world.

According to the University of Reading Classics Department, Sourvinou-Inwood's acknowledged supremacy in the area of Greek religion studies made a lasting contribution to the Department's research, and this field continues to be one of its strongholds in the twenty-first century. In 2018, the Festschrift Πλειών. Papers in memory of Christiane Sourvinou-Inwood was published by the University of Crete, edited by Athena Kavoulaki. This followed a memorial conference that was held in 2012 in Crete.

Polis-Religion Model 
One of Sourvinou-Inwood's most influential works was her development of the 'Polis-religion' model, which demonstrated how the ancient Greek city (polis) controlled religious life. This was originally explored in two articles, entitled "What is Polis Religion?" and "Further Aspects of Polis Religion"; the former has been described as "unquestionably the most influential article on Greek religion of the last 25 years".

Honours
Carl Newell Jackson Lectures at Harvard University (1994)

Fiction and poetry 
After retiring from teaching in 1988, Sourvinou-Inwood began writing mystery novels set in ancient Greece, featuring a priestess as the detective; the novels draw extensively on her research. A collection of poems written during her undergraduate studies has also recently been published.

Selected bibliography

Theseus as Son and Stepson: A Tentative Illustration of Greek Mythological Mentality (1979); 
Studies in Girls' Transitions: Aspects of the Arkteia and Age Representation in Attic Iconography (1988)
"Reading" Greek Culture: Texts and Images, Rituals and Myths (1991); "Reading" Greek Death: To the End of the Classical Period (1995); 
"What is Polis Religion?" and "Further Aspects of Polis Religion" in Oxford Readings in Greek Religion (edited by Richard Buxton 2000)Tragedy and Athenian Religion (2003);  Athenian Myths and Festivals: Aglauros, Erechtheus, Plynteria, Panathenaia, Dionysia (posthumously edited and published by Robert Parker 2011); 

NovelsMurder Most Classical (under the pseudonym Christiana Elfwood, 2007); Murder at the City Dionysia (2008); Murder near the Sanctuary'' (2008);

Notes

External links 
Obituary - The Telegraph
Influential decoder of the culture of ancient Greece

1945 births
2007 deaths
Hellenists
People from Volos
National and Kapodistrian University of Athens alumni
Alumni of the University of Oxford
Academics of the University of Liverpool
Academics of the University of Reading
Scholars of ancient Greek history
Scholars of ancient Greek literature
Greek archaeologists
Greek women archaeologists
20th-century archaeologists
Greek emigrants to the United Kingdom